Lester Normandy Martínez Tut (born 17 October 1995) is a Guatemalan professional boxer. As an amateur, he won a light-welterweight silver medal at the 2012 Youth World Championships and a middleweight gold medal at the 2018 Central American and Caribbean Games.

Early years
Martínez was born on 17 October 1995 in the municipality of Melchor de Mencos in Petén Department, but grew up in San Benito. He began boxing at the age of twelve and won the schoolboy national championship in 2009. He soon moved to the capital, Guatemala City, to continue his development. He won his first international competition in 2011, earning a gold medal at that year's Central American Championships in Managua. The following year, he repeated as Central American champion and won gold at the Panamerican School Games before taking home a silver at the Youth World Championships in Yerevan, becoming the first Guatemalan to ever medal at an AIBA world championship. He also lost to Jamel Herring in the 2012 American Boxing Olympic Qualification Tournament. After achieving back-to-back first-place finishes at the Central American Games in 2013 and 2017, he became the first Guatemalan boxer in 68 years to win gold at the Central American and Caribbean Games when he beat former World and Olympic champion Arlen López for the middleweight crown in 2018.

Amateur results

2009 National Schoolboys Championships in Guatemala (bantamweight)
 Defeated Cristian Estrada PTS
 Defeated Dani Lopez PTS 

2011 Panamerican Junior Championships in Tena, Ecuador (light-welterweight)
 Lost to Miguel Ferrín (Ecuador)

2011 Central American Championships in Managua, Nicaragua (light-welterweight)
 Defeated Alfredo de Jesus Martinez (El Salvador) 19–11
 Defeated Álvaro Mercado (Nicaragua) 23–15 

2012 American Olympic Qualification Tournament in Rio de Janeiro, Brazil (light-welterweight)
 Defeated Kendall Ebanks (Cayman Islands) WO
 Lost to Jamel Herring (United States) 9–15

2012 Panamerican School Games in Guatemala City, Guatemala (light-welterweight)
 Defeated Carlos Rosas (Venezuela) RSC1 

2012 Central American Championships in San José, Costa Rica (welterweight)
 Defeated David Lobo (Costa Rica) 28–10
 Defeated Roberto Arriaza (Nicaragua) 11–1 

2012 Youth World Championships in Yerevan, Armenia (light-welterweight)
 Defeated Naim Azizov (Tajikistan) 23–11
 Defeated Ricky Rowlands (Wales) 19–14
 Defeated Izatulla Shermakhamadov (Kyrgyzstan) 22–16
 Defeated Carlos Adames (Dominican Republic) 22–15
 Defeated Parviz Baghirov (Azerbaijan) 13–9
 Lost to Kevin Hayler Brown (Cuba) 14–17 

2013 Central American Games in San José, Costa Rica (light-welterweight)
 Defeated Daniel Álvarez (Honduras) 21–7
 Defeated Omer Rodríguez (Panama) 26–9
 Defeated Julio Laguna (Nicaragua) 14–9 

2013 Jose Cheo Aponte Tournament in Caguas, Puerto Rico (light-welterweight)
 Elite bracket
 Lost to Damian Giro (Puerto Rico) WO
 Youth bracket
 Defeated Ángel López (Puerto Rico) PTS
 Lost to Jonathan Santos (Brazil) PTS 

2014 Central American and Caribbean Games qualification in Tijuana, Mexico (welterweight)
 Defeated Alberto Puello (Dominican Republic) 2–1
 Defeated Carl Hield (The Bahamas) 3–0
 Lost to Roniel Iglesias (Cuba) 0–3 

2014 Pacific Cup in Guayaquil, Ecuador (welterweight)
 Defeated Abel Mina (Ecuador) 2–1
 Defeated Manuel Guzmán (Costa Rica) 3–0
 Lost to Alberto Puello (Dominican Republic) 1–2 

2014 Central American and Caribbean Games in Veracruz, Mexico (welterweight)
 Lost to Carl Hield (The Bahamas) 0–3

2015 Jose Cheo Aponte Tournament in Caguas, Puerto Rico (welterweight)
 Defeated Jose Peguero (U.S. Virgin Islands) 3–0
 Defeated Jose Roman (Puerto Rico) 3–0
 Lost to Joelvis Hernández (Venezuela) 1–2 

2015 Pan American Games qualification in Tijuana, Mexico (welterweight)
 Lost to Juan Ramón Solano (Dominican Republic) 0–2

2015 Panamerican Championships in Vargas, Venezuela (welterweight)
 Defeated Daniel Munoz (Chile) 3–0
 Lost to Roniel Iglesias (Cuba) 0–3

2015 National Championships in Guatemala City, Guatemala (welterweight)
 Defeated Luis Barillas 

2015 World Championships in Doha, Qatar (welterweight)
 Lost to Marvin Cabrera (Mexico) 0–3

2016 American Olympic Qualification Tournament in Buenos Aires, Argentina (welterweight)
 Defeated Yogly Vargas (Colombia) 3–0
 Defeated Jose Roman (Puerto Rico) 3–0
 Lost to Gabriel Maestre (Venezuela) 1–2
 Lost to Alberto Palmetta (Argentina) 0–3

2016 Giraldo Cordova Cardin Tournament in Havana, Cuba (welterweight)
 Defeated Liu Wei (China) 2–1
 Defeated Arisnoidys Despaigne (Cuba) 2–1
 Lost to Antonio Bicet (Cuba) 1–2 

2016 World Olympic Qualifying Tournament in Baku, Azerbaijan (welterweight)
Lost to Paul Kroll (United States) 0–3

2016 Maiduvin Trujillo Cup in Antigua, Guatemala (middleweight)
 Defeated Isamary Lima (Guatemala) 3–0
 Defeated Jaime Lemus (El Salvador) 3–0 

2017 Panamerican Championships in Tegucigalpa, Honduras (middleweight)
 Defeated Joseph Cherkashyn (Chile) 3–0
 Defeated Hebert Conceição (Brazil) 4–1
 Lost to Arlen López (Cuba) 2–3 

2017 World Championships in Hamburg, Germany (middleweight)
 Lost to Max van der Pas (Netherlands) 2–3

2017 National Championships in Guatemala City, Guatemala (middleweight)
 Defeated Misael Cruz Barahona
 Defeated Luis Arturo García 

2017 Central American Games in Managua, Nicaragua (middleweight)
 Defeated Jairo Luna (El Salvador) 5–0
 Defeated Lester Espino (Nicaragua) 5–0 

2018 Central American and Caribbean Games qualification in Tijuana, Mexico (middleweight)
 Lost to Arlen López (Cuba) 1–4

2018 Central American and Caribbean Games in Barranquilla, Colombia (middleweight)
 Defeated Luis Hernández (Panama) 5–0
 Defeated Luis Rodríguez (Puerto Rico) 5–0
 Defeated Arlen López (Cuba) 3–2

Professional career
In January 2019 Martínez announced his decision to go pro by signing a deal with Latin ARMS Promotions and former referee Richard Steele as his manager. He trained with the legendary Ignacio Beristáin in Mexico, and his first opponent was announced to be 46-year-old Nicaraguan former world champion Ricardo Mayorga, who stated in an interview that he would retire if he lost to the 23-year-old. On 6 April 2019 he defeated Mayorga by technical knockout (TKO) in the main event of a card in Guatemala City, backing the ex-champ into the ropes with power shots until the referee waved it off in the final second of the second round. Two months later faced Daniel Montejo in Tijuana, scoring three knockdowns en route to a first-round knockout (KO) victory. After a quick 4–0 start, he went through a long period of inactivity due to the COVID-19 pandemic. He made his return on 27 August 2020, stopping Mexican rival Abraham Hernández in the second round of their Roy Jones Jr.-promoted fight in Guaymas.

Professional boxing record

References

External links
 
 AIBA bio

Living people
1995 births
Guatemalan male boxers
Super-middleweight boxers
Competitors at the 2018 Central American and Caribbean Games
Central American and Caribbean Games gold medalists for Guatemala
Central American and Caribbean Games medalists in boxing
People from Petén Department
Central American Games gold medalists for Guatemala
Central American Games medalists in boxing